Kuzma Pavlovich Chaynikov, better known as Kuzebay Gerd (14 January 1896, in Bolshaya Dokya village – 1 November 1937, in Sandarmokh) was an Udmurt poet, a prose writer, a playwright, a public figure, and a nationalist. He was executed in Sandarmokh during the Great Purge and was posthumously rehabilitated (exonerated) in 1958.

References

External links
 Biography 
 Kuzebay Gerd: «One of the many» 
 Biography
  House-Museum of Kuzebay Gerd
  Kuzebay Gerd on Finugor.ru

1896 births
1937 deaths
People from Udmurtia
People from Malmyzhsky Uyezd
Udmurt people
Russian male poets
Russian dramatists and playwrights
Russian male dramatists and playwrights
20th-century Russian poets
20th-century dramatists and playwrights
Censorship in the Soviet Union
Great Purge victims from Russia
Soviet rehabilitations
20th-century Russian journalists